WonderLuk.com was an online fashion marketplace that sold on-demand 3D-printed fashion accessories and jewellery. In 2017, WonderLuk's founders announced that they would be discontinuing the brand owing to limited market interest.

History

The company was based in London and was founded by Roberta Lucca and Andre Schober in 2013 before it was launched in April 2014. WonderLuk have sold 3D-printed bracelets, brooches, necklaces, rings, earrings, bow ties and smartphone cases. The designs have been created by architects, product and jewellery designers from around the world. All products are made to order in a location close to the customer using distributed manufacturing. The products are currently made from nylon using selective laser sintering and metals such as sterling silver, titanium and 18k gold. The founders take a strong stance against overproduction and mass-produced fashion. In a recent interview one of the co-founders stated that "the era of customisation had begun" and predicted that fashion customers in the future will want totally customised items, instantly delivered to their homes. WonderLuk was nominated for the 3D Printshow Global Awards 2014. In August 2015, WonderLuk opened the first pop-up store for 3D-printed jewellery in Europe  and in November 2015, WonderLuk collaborated with Topshop to open a 3D-printed accessories pop-up store at their Oxford Circus branch.

References

External links
Official Website
Body Jewellery

Fashion accessory brands
British brands
British companies established in 2013
Jewellery companies of the United Kingdom